Gravenhurst may refer to:
Gravenhurst, Ontario, a town in Canada
Gravenhurst, Bedfordshire, a civil parish in England
Gravenhurst (band), a UK band